Waterford Kettering High School is a public high school in the Waterford School District located in Waterford, Michigan.  The official name of the high school is Charles F. Kettering High School, named for the automotive industry pioneer.

History

Waterford Kettering High School opened in 1961.

In 1983, the school district consolidated high schools and closed Waterford Township High School. This left two high schools in the district; Kettering and Waterford Mott High School.

In the fall of 1990, ninth graders joined the Kettering student body.

Extracurricular activities

Athletics
Waterford Kettering fields teams in baseball, basketball, bowling, cheerleading, cross country, football, golf, hockey, lacrosse, skiing, soccer, softball, swimming, tennis, track, volleyball, diving, and wrestling. Kettering has won three state championships, two for softball in 1991 and 1998, and one for Men's Bowling in 2018.

Music
Waterford Kettering has several musical ensembles: three concert bands, two jazz bands, the Marching Captains marching band, Kettering Chorus, Concert Choir, Harmonia (Advanced Select Women), Chamber Choir (Advanced Select), a philharmonic orchestra, a symphony orchestra, and a chamber orchestra. The WK Marching Captains, Wind Ensemble, Chamber and Mass Choir, and orchestras performed at Disney Magic Music Days in 2003, 2007, 2011, 2015 and 2019.

Theatre
Waterford Kettering's Theatre Department and Drama Club put on several shows each year, including one musical and at least one play.

Notable alumni
Michael L. Good (1977), dean, University of Florida College of Medicine
Dave Marsh (1968), music critic
Jim Miller (1989), former NFL player 
Pat LaFontaine (1983), former NHL player; Member, Hockey Hall of Fame (2003)
Kirk Gibson (1975), former MLB player
Gail Goestenkors (1981), former head women's basketball coach, University of Texas
Paul Fry (2010), MLB relief pitcher for Baltimore Orioles.

References

External links
Waterford Kettering High School

Public high schools in Michigan
Educational institutions established in 1961
High schools in Oakland County, Michigan
Schools in Waterford Township, Michigan
1961 establishments in Michigan
Charles F. Kettering